Elmar Reinders (born 14 March 1992 in Emmen) is a Dutch racing cyclist, who currently rides for UCI WorldTeam .

Major results

2012
 8th Ronde van Noord-Holland
2013
 3rd Ster van Zwolle
 4th Overall Olympia's Tour
 6th Ronde van Drenthe
2014
 2nd Overall Tour de Berlin
1st Stage 1
 5th Overall Olympia's Tour
1st Stage 2 (TTT)
2015
 1st Ster van Zwolle
 1st Stage 1a (TTT) Olympia's Tour
 3rd Dorpenomloop Rucphen
 4th Arno Wallaard Memorial
 6th Parel van de Veluwe
 7th Zuid Oost Drenthe Classic I
2016
 1st ZODC Zuidenveld Tour
 2nd Arno Wallaard Memorial
 4th Ronde van Overijssel
 8th Ronde van Drenthe
 8th Fyen Rundt
 9th Overall Tour du Loir-et-Cher
 9th Dorpenomloop Rucphen
2017
 5th Ronde van Drenthe
 5th Dorpenomloop Rucphen
 8th Dwars door West-Vlaanderen
 10th Trofeo Serra de Tramuntana
2018
 1st  Combativity classification, BinckBank Tour
 3rd Trofeo Lloseta–Andratx
2019
 1st  Mountains classification, Tour of Norway
 8th Le Samyn
2020
 7th Overall Tour Poitou-Charentes en Nouvelle-Aquitaine
2021
 1st Skive–Løbet
 1st PWZ Zuidenveld Tour
 1st Stage 4 Tour de Bretagne
 3rd Ster van Zwolle
 4th Route Adélie
 5th GP Herning
 5th Himmerland Rundt
 9th Fyen Rundt
2022
 1st Arno Wallaard Memorial
 1st Visit Friesland Elfsteden Race
 Tour de Bretagne
1st  Points classification
1st Stage 5
 Olympia's Tour
1st  Points classification
1st Stage 3
 1st Stage 1 Circuit des Ardennes
 2nd Fyen Rundt
 4th Grand Prix Herning
 5th Time trial, National Road Championships
 9th Volta Limburg Classic

References

External links

1992 births
Living people
Dutch male cyclists
Sportspeople from Emmen, Netherlands
Cyclists from Drenthe
21st-century Dutch people